Brückenberg is a mountain of Saxony, southeastern Germany. With an elevation of 963.8 m above NHN, it is considered one of the highest mountains in Saxon Ore Mountain Range.

Geography and Location 
It is separated from the neighbouring mountain of Auersberg by the valley of the Große Bockau river.

A silver-bearing domeykite-ß (copper-deficient arsenide) has been reported to be found in Brückenberg.

References

External links 

 (in German)
 
 

Mountains of Saxony
Mountains of the Ore Mountains